The 2015 Toyota/Save Mart 350 was a NASCAR Sprint Cup Series race held on June 28, 2015 at Sonoma Raceway in Sonoma, California. Contested over 110 laps on the 1.99 mile (3.2 km) road course, it was the 16th race of the 2015 NASCAR Sprint Cup Series season. Kyle Busch won the race, first of the season and first since the 2014 Auto Club 400. Brother Kurt Busch finished runner-up and Clint Bowyer finished third. Kevin Harvick and Joey Logano rounded out the top five.

A. J. Allmendinger won the pole for the race and led one lap before engine issues took him out of contention and finished 37th. Jimmie Johnson led a race high of 45 laps before getting passed for the lead with a few laps to go and finished sixth. The race had nine lead changes among five different drivers, as well as five caution flag periods for 21 laps. There was one red flag period for ten minutes and 30 seconds.

This was the 30th career victory for Kyle Busch, second at Sonoma Raceway and fourth at the track for Joe Gibbs Racing. This win moved Busch up to 37th in the points standings. Despite being the winning manufacturer, Toyota left Sonoma trailing Chevrolet by 94 points in the manufacturer standings.

The Toyota/Save Mart 350 was carried by Fox Sports on the cable/satellite Fox Sports 1 network for the American television audience. The radio broadcast for the race was carried by the Performance Racing Network and Sirius XM NASCAR Radio.

Report

Background

Sonoma Raceway, formerly Sears Point Raceway and Infineon Raceway, is a  road course and drag strip located on the landform known as Sears Point in the southern Sonoma Mountains in Sonoma, California, USA. It is host to one of only two NASCAR Sprint Cup Series races each year that are run on road courses (the other being Watkins Glen International in Watkins Glen, New York), and one of six national series road course races (Xfinity Series racing at Watkins Glen, Mid-Ohio Sports Car Course and Road America; and the Camping World Truck Series at Canadian Tire Motorsport Park). It is also host to the Verizon IndyCar Series and several other auto races and motorcycle races such as the American Federation of Motorcyclists series. Sonoma Raceway continues to host amateur, or club racing events which may or may not be open to the general public. The largest such car club is the Sports Car Club of America.

With the closure of Riverside International Raceway in Riverside, California after the 1988 season, NASCAR, wanting a west coast road course event to replace it, chose the Sears Point facility. Riverside Raceway was razed for a shopping center development.

In 2002, Sears Point Raceway was renamed after a corporate sponsor, Infineon. However, as with many renamings of sports complexes, many people still call it by its original name (it was never affiliated with Sears, Roebuck and Company, having been named for the nearby Sears Point Ranch founded in the 1850s by settler Franklin Sears). On March 7, 2012, it was announced that Infineon would not renew their contract for naming rights when the deal expired in May, and the track management is looking for a new company to take over naming rights. Until it can find a new corporate sponsor, the course is simply identifying itself as "Sonoma".

Kevin Harvick entered Sonoma with a 15-point lead over Martin Truex Jr. Joey Logano entered 56 back. Dale Earnhardt Jr. entered 68 back. Jimmie Johnson entered 70 back.

New pit road policy
Following a miscommunication in the Xfinity race at Chicagoland Speedway that resulted in 19 cars pitting before pit road was officially opened, NASCAR announced that the indicator light at the entrance of pit road would be controlled by the officials in race control instead of an official at pit entrance.

Entry list

The entry list for the Toyota/Save Mart 350 was released on Friday, June 19 at 2:32 p.m. Eastern time. Forty-four cars were entered for the race. All but the No. 95 Leavine Family Racing Ford driven by Michael McDowell were entered for the previous race at Michigan. Three driver changes took place for this weekend. Boris Said drove the No. 32 Go FAS Racing Ford in place of Mike Bliss. Alex Kennedy drove the No. 33 Hillman-Circle Sport LLC Chevrolet for Ty Dillon. Justin Marks attempted to make his first start of the season in the No. 34 Front Row Motorsports Ford for Brett Moffitt. The No. 98 Phil Parsons Racing entry, driven by Josh Wise, switched from Ford to Chevrolet for this race. Jeff Gordon, the all-time winningest driver at Sonoma Raceway, made his 23rd and final start at the track.

Practice

First practice

Final practice

Qualifying

"I’ve really got to thank all my guys that are here and especially back at the shop," Allmendinger said. "They’ve worked on this car so much to do everything that we need to get as much speed out of it as possible. So, it’s a good day, but we’ve got to focus on tomorrow.” “It has a nice balance all the way through, the braking and transmission gears, and the overall corner speed," Kurt Busch said after qualifying second. "It’s a nice package that (crew chief) Tony Gibson gave me, and all the guys back at the shop." “Yeah, we kind of overachieved today," Matt Kenseth said after qualifying third. "We were really bad yesterday, we were really bad the first round. I’m pleasantly surprised and kind of confused as far as we’ve been off, but we’ll take that.” "I think the car was capable of being at least first or second," Jeff Gordon said after qualifying fifth. "I missed one corner there on that last run and I don’t know how much that cost me, but overall it was a really solid effort." Brendan Gaughan was the lone driver that failed to make the race.

Qualifying results

Race

First half

Start

The race was scheduled to start at 3:19 p.m. but started three minutes later when A. J. Allmendinger led the field to the green flag. Kurt Busch jumped ahead of Allmendinger in turn 2 and led the first lap. The field settled into a single file rhythm. Jamie McMurray made an unscheduled pit stop on lap 10 for a flat right side tire. Denny Hamlin also made an unscheduled pit stop on that lap for a loose right-rear tire. The first caution of the race flew on lap 22 when David Gilliland slid off the track and slammed into the tire barrier in turn 10 due to a flat left-front tire. “That was a bad deal," Gilliland said. "I just passed Sam Hornish Jr. up in seven and went through the esses and I just told Donnie (crew chief Wingo), ‘I think I’ve got a left-front going down. It’s soft.’ We were gonna come in and pit that lap and I eased up a little bit going through 10, but it never turned and once you get off in the dirt there that’s a bad place to get off. "It was a big hit, but I’m OK.  I’m just bummed out for the situation. This is a great race track. We really love racing out here and I’ve had some great finishes here, but we’ll have to wait until next year to try again.” Under caution, Clint Bowyer opted not to pit and assumed the lead.

Second quarter
The race restarted on lap 27. Kyle Busch passed Bowyer in turn 7a to take the lead one lap later. The second caution flew on lap 29 when David Ragan made contact with Martin Truex Jr. and turned him into the wall in turn 8. “When you’re mid-pack, it’s not a good place to be,” Truex Jr. told Fox. “It’s just really congested. We were a lot faster than a couple of guys around us and you’re trying not to get run over and you’re trying to make moves. Every time I passed the 55, he would just keep staying on the side of me and not giving me three or four inches to get clear so we could all get going. I guess he turned me on purpose. I ran into the side of him first, so I kind of had it coming. But that was an accident. I thought I gave him enough room there coming out of the esses.” Ragan gave his take on the incident after exiting the race on lap 79. “I didn’t get together with the '78', the '78' ran me off the race track, just body slammed me," said Ragan, who finished 39th. "I was just trying to get back on the race track. That’s a great instance where the '78' just absolutely did me wrong and I’m trying to get back on the race track. That’s unfortunate for him, it’s never good to see anybody tear up their race car. Martin would probably not do that again if he had an opportunity.” The damage to the concrete wall was severe enough that NASCAR red flagged the race on lap 32 for 10 minutes and 30 seconds.

The race restarted on lap 34. Kurt Busch passed brother Kyle Busch in turn 11 to take back the lead on lap 40. Matt Kenseth blew out a left-rear tire in turn 4a and had to make an unscheduled pit stop on lap 45. A number of drivers, including Jeff Gordon, began hitting pit road on lap 52. Kurt Busch gave up the lead on lap 53 to make his pit stop and gave it to Jimmie Johnson.

Second half

Halfway

Allmendinger began reporting fuel pickup issues on lap 57. He made an unscheduled pit stop on lap 60. Justin Allgaier ran out of fuel on lap 65, but coasted the car back to pit road and the race stayed green. Johnson hit pit road on lap 67 and the lead was given back to Kurt Busch. The third caution of the race flew on lap 74 when J. J. Yeley, exiting turn 10, got loose and hit the inside wall. Johnson opted not to pit and reassumed the lead.

The race restarted with 32 laps to go. The fourth caution of the race flew on the same lap when Carl Edwards, entering the esses, hit Ragan and spun down into the wall.

Fourth quarter 
The race restarted with 26 laps to go. Kurt Busch went off track in turn 10 with 14 laps to go. The air intake became covered with grass. Debris on the front stretch brought out the fifth caution of the race with twelve laps to go. Exiting turn 11, the left-rear wheel house of Casey Mears's car came off. While Johnson opted to stay out, almost every other driver opted to pit for tires. Coming into his pit box, Matt DiBenedetto got clipped and turned by one of the track's cleanup trucks.

The race restarted with seven laps to go. Kyle Busch passed Johnson climbing up turn 3 to take the lead with five laps to go. Michael McDowell went off track in turn 7a with three to go, but got the car going and the race remained green. Kyle Busch drove away to score his 30th career win. And it is also the first time that the Busch brothers had a 1-2 with Kyle in first and his brother, Kurt, in second.

Post-race

Driver comments

“This is awesome – it’s unbelievable," said Busch. "Can’t say enough about my team, everyone at Joe Gibbs Racing. I can’t say enough about my medical team that got me back in shape and ready to go behind the wheel. We have our work cut out for us, we knew we did in the beginning and I knew we put us in the hole in points. It’s unfortunate that we’ve had a couple crashes. I hate it for my guys, they don’t deserve to be in that spot. They have certainly worked hard all year long." "Just a lot of things went wrong. We had probably the fastest car on the racetrack it just took us all day to overcome all the stuff we had going on," said Harvick after finishing fourth. "Just want to thank Budweiser, Outback, Folds of Honor, everybody from Jimmy John's and Chevrolet for everything they do for our team." "I saw there were a bunch of cars between myself and the first guy on (new) tires," Johnson said after finishing sixth. "I felt pretty good about things. And then after about a lap and a half, I wasn't feeling so good about things. They were there quickly. But if we came back tomorrow, we'd still run the same strategy. We played it perfectly." "They dropped the green and we were moving forward," Gordon said after finishing 16th in his final start at Sonoma Raceway. "I was pretty happy with it. I felt that rear starting to go off pretty early on and saw some guys coming from further back. And so we tried to make a couple of adjustments. It just seemed as the track continued to lay rubber, our set-up, which we were taking a little bit of a gamble and risk with, but it looked good in practice; but it just didn’t pay off for us. The car was really, really good there at the end. Nothing’s going to take away from this weekend for me. I know it wasn’t the finish we all wanted, but it was a very memorable weekend. It’s still a little bit more fun to go to hang out with some of my friends and family here. But, I hate that we weren’t a little bit better. And that last thing, I was just taking some risk on that last pit stop. We didn’t have anything to lose at that point.”

Race results

Race statistics
9 lead changes among 5 different drivers
5 cautions for 21 laps; 1 red flag for 10 minutes, 30 seconds
Time of race: 2 hours, 55 minutes, 39 seconds
Average speed: 
Kyle Busch took home $315,481 in winnings

Race awards
 Coors Light Pole Award: A. J. Allmendinger (1:14.385)
 3M Lap Leader: Jimmie Johnson (45 laps)
 American Ethanol Green Flag Restart Award: Kyle Busch
 Duralast Brakes "Bake In The Race" Award: Kurt Busch
 Freescale "Wide Open": Kurt Busch
 Ingersoll Rand Power Move: Sam Hornish Jr. (8 positions)
 MAHLE Clevite Engine Builder of the Race: Hendrick Engines, #41
 Mobil 1 Driver of the Race: Kurt Busch (137.7 driver rating)
 Moog Steering and Suspension Problem Solver of The Race: Joey Logano (crew chief Todd Gordon (0.570))
 NASCAR Sprint Cup Leader Bonus: No winner: rolls over to $130,000 at next event
 Sherwin-Williams Fastest Lap: A. J. Allmendinger (Lap, 1:15.570)
 Sunoco Rookie of The Race: Alex Kennedy

Media

Television
Fox Sports covered their seventh race at Sonoma Raceway and their first since 2006. Mike Joy, Larry McReynolds and Darrell Waltrip had the call in the booth for the race. Jamie Little, Chris Neville, Vince Welch and Matt Yocum handled the pit road duties for the television side.

Radio
PRN had the radio call for the race, which was simulcast on Sirius XM NASCAR Radio. Doug Rice and Mark Garrow called the race in the booth when the field was racing past the pit straight. Pat Patterson called the race from atop turn 3a when the field was racing up turns 2, 3 and 3a. Brad Gillie called the race from a platform outside turn 7a when the field was racing through turns 4a, 7a and 8. Rob Albright called the race from a billboard outside turn 10 when the field was racing down turns 8a, 9 and 10. Heather DuBoise, Brett McMillan, Jim Noble and Steve Richards worked pit road for PRN.

Standings after the race

Drivers' Championship standings

Manufacturers' Championship standings

Note: Only the first sixteen positions are included for the driver standings.

Notes

References

Toyota Save Mart 350
Toyota Save Mart 350
NASCAR races at Sonoma Raceway